Volpiano is a comune (municipality) in the Metropolitan City of Turin, in the Italian region Piedmont.
The city is located about 15 km north-east of Turin.

It is an industrial (fuel, transportation, electronics) and agricultural (wheat, corn) center in the lower Canavese.

Twin towns  
Volpiano is twinned with:

  Castries, Hérault, France (2010)

References

External links
 Official website

Cities and towns in Piedmont
Canavese